¿Qué le pasa a mi familia? (English title: Keeping My Family Together) is a Mexican telenovela that aired on Las Estrellas from 22 February 2021 to 11 July 2021. The series is produced by Juan Osorio. It is an adaptation of the South Korean series What Happens to My Family?, and stars Diana Bracho, Mané de la Parra, and Eva Cedeño.

Plot 
Regina Rueda (Eva Cedeño), is a woman with clear goals and has the strength to achieve them. She is an executive assistant to the president of a major clothing and footwear company. Due to a sentimental failure, she does not believe in love. Patricio Iturbide (Mané de la Parra) is the director of one of the most important fashion and footwear companies in Mexico. Upon meeting Regina, Patricio 's life takes a big turn, leading him to live a love story with her.

Cast

Main 
 Diana Bracho as Luz Torres Mendoza
 César Évora as Jesús Rojas Bañuelos
 Julián Gil as Carlos Iturbide Urquidi
 Gabriela Platas as Violeta Anaya Escobar
 Emilio Osorio as Lalo Rueda Torres
 Gonzalo Peña as Mariano Rueda Torres 
 Eva Cedeño as Regina Rueda Torres
 Mané de la Parra as Patricio Iturbide Casanova
 Julio Bracho as Esteban Astudillo Vidal
 Wendy de los Cobos as Alfonsina "Ponchita" Torres Mendoza
 René Casados as Wenceslao Rueda Cortés
 Paulina Matos as Constanza "Cony" Astudillo Anaya
 Lisette Morelos as Ofelia del Olmo Gascón
 Gloria Aura as Federica Muñoz Torres
 Danka as Marisol "Sol" Morales Flores
 Mauricio Abad as Alan Barba del Olmo
 Margarita Vega as Pamela Pérez Nava
 Roberta Burns as Gilda Huerta Godínez
 Claudia Arce as Salma Montes de Oca Medinilla
 Tania Nicole as Isabel Vázquez Muñoz
 Adolfo de la Fuente as Miguel "Mike" Vázquez Peralta
 Rafael Inclán as Fulgencio Morales Yela
 Fernando Noriega as Mariano Rueda Torres

Recurring 
 Nicole Chávez as Camila Castillo Jaurello
 Beatriz Morayra as Rosalba Reyes Toledo
 Sherlyn as Jade Castillo Jaurello
 Juan Martín Jáuregui as Iván García Altamirano
 Sergio Basáñez as Porfirio Reiner Springer
 Lucía Zerecero as Zafiro Castillo Jaurello
 Magaly Torres as María Olivares Zapata
 Claudia Silva as Brenda Macías Vega
 Iker Vallin as Maximiliano Macías Vega
 Eva Daniela as Lorena Pineda

Guest stars 
 Kali Uchis as Claudia

Production 
The production was announced on 16 June 2020, during the Univision Upfront for the 2020–2021 television season. Filming began on 9 November 2020 in Guanajuato City. Location shooting in Guanajuato City concluded on 29 May 2021, while filming at Televisa San Ángel concluded on 12 June 2021.

Casting 
On 1 September 2020, it was confirmed that José Ron and Ariadne Díaz would star in the lead roles. However, on 23 September 2020, José Ron announced that he would not participate in the telenovela. On 16 October 2020, Ariadne Díaz announced that she would no longer star in the telenovela due to prior commitments. Elizabeth Álvarez and Karol Sevilla were also considered but both decided to reject the telenovela. On 19 October 2020, it was announced that Mané de la Parra and Eva Cedeño were the protagonist of the telenovela, the rest of the cast was also confirmed.

Ratings 
 
}}

Episodes

Notes

References

External links 
 

2021 telenovelas
2021 Mexican television series debuts
2021 Mexican television series endings
2020s Mexican television series
Televisa telenovelas
Spanish-language telenovelas
Mexican telenovelas
Mexican television series based on South Korean television series